The JC Ferrero Challenger Open is a professional tennis tournament played on clay courts. It is currently part of the ATP Challenger Tour. It is held annually in Alicante, Spain since 2018.

Past finals

Singles

Doubles

References

ATP Challenger Tour
Clay court tennis tournaments
Tennis tournaments in Spain
Recurring sporting events established in 2018